Hyloxalus edwardsi (common name: Edwards' rocket frog) is a species of frogs in the family Dendrobatidae. It is endemic to the Cordillera Oriental in the Cundinamarca Department, Colombia. It is named after Stephen R. Edwards from the University of Kansas Natural History Museum, a colleague of John D. Lynch who described this species in 1982.

Its natural habitats are streams within caves and crevices in paramos.
It is threatened by habitat loss.

References

edwardsi
Amphibians of the Andes
Amphibians of Colombia
Endemic fauna of Colombia
Amphibians described in 1982
Páramo fauna
Taxonomy articles created by Polbot